Sasso di Bosconero (2,468 m) is the highest mountain of the Bosconero Range, a subgroup of the southern Dolomites in Veneto, Italy. It appears as a giant pyramid that hangs over the Zoldo Valley, near the town of Longarone. It was first climbed in 1878 by Cesare Tomè and Gottfried Merzbacher along with local guide Santo Siorpaes.

References

Mountains of the Alps
Dolomites
Mountains of Veneto